Elfrid Payton may refer to:
Elfrid Payton (Canadian football) (born 1967), American player of Canadian football
Elfrid Payton (basketball) (born 1994), American basketball player